Lake Aux Mouches (: Fly Lake) is a lake in the Côte-Nord region of the province of Quebec, Canada.

Location

Lake Aux Mouches is in the unorganized territory of Lac-Walker in Sept-Rivières Regional County Municipality, Quebec.
As of November 2021 the Commission de toponymie du Québec had not determined the origin or meaning of the name.

Hydrology
The Schmon River has its source in Lac au Vent and Lac aux Mouches.
It flows south for almost  to Lake Walker.
Lac au Vent has outlets to Lac a la Pluie and Lac aux Mouches.
From Lac aux Mouches the river flows south through Lac Flambeau and Lac Schmon, then onwards to the Gulf of St. Lawrence.
There are rapids in the river immediately below its exit from the lake.

Notes

Sources

Lakes of Côte-Nord